The Virginia Tech Sports Hall of Fame was established in 1982 to honor and preserve the memory of athletes, coaches, administrators and staff members who have made outstanding contributions to athletics at Virginia Tech. A total of 211 individuals have been inducted to the Tech Hall of Fame during special annual ceremonies held each fall.

References

External links

Sports halls of fame
Awards established in 1982
1982 establishments in Virginia
Virginia Tech Hokies